Edgbaston Village is a tram stop on the West Midlands Metro located in Edgbaston. It opened on 17 July 2022 as the line 1 current terminus when it was extended from Library.

References

Edgbaston
Railway stations in Great Britain opened in 2022
West Midlands Metro stops